Synanthedon melliniformis is a moth of the family Sesiidae. It is found in France, Italy, Austria, Slovenia, Croatia, Bosnia and Herzegovina, Serbia and Montenegro, Bulgaria, Hungary and Slovakia.

The wingspan is 17–19 mm.

The larvae feed on Salix alba, Populus nigra and Populus alba.

References

Moths described in 1801
Sesiidae
Moths of Europe
Taxa named by Jakob Heinrich Laspeyres